The Guy Game is an adult video game developed by Topheavy Studios and published by Gathering, released for Microsoft Windows, PlayStation 2, and Xbox in 2004. Presented in a trivia gameshow-style supporting up to four players, it consists of about 1,000 questions spread out over 20 episodes. Much of the game involves watching live-action video footage of young women in bikinis, and as the player succeeds in the game the women eventually expose their breasts. The game garnered much controversy and was the subject of a lawsuit.

Gameplay

After every question there is video footage—shot during spring break festivities on South Padre Island—of host Matt Sadler giving the same question to young females in bikinis (referred to as "hotties"). If they answer incorrectly, they are required to show their breasts. Before they give their answers, the footage is paused and the player is asked to guess whether the hotties answered correctly or not. In the "TitWitz" portions of the game, the player is told that they were wrong, and asked to guess what wrong answer they gave. The more times the player is able to correctly predict the outcome, the higher the "Flash-O-Meter" (with levels based on the erectile process) rises, and the more exposed the breasts become. At first, the breasts are obscured by a Guy Game logo ("Soft and Squishy" level), then just digitally blurred ("Sorta Chubby" level), and finally fully uncensored ("Super Stiff" level, maxed-out meter). Once the player reaches the uncensored level, the episode can be played again with no visual censorship. As the game progresses, the players are ranked as President, Vice President, Treasurer, or Asshole. Also included are the "Ballz" minigames which can give players extra points during an episode. Before the game, each player chooses a female avatar (called cheerleaders) to represent them. Based on how often the player correctly guesses the outcome of each hottie's response, the more clothes the cheerleader removes. At the end of the episode, a short video montage is shown of the cheerleader belonging to the player who reached the rank of President. Many other rules can be enabled, most inspired by drinking games.

Controversy

Lawsuit
Four months after the game's release, a lawsuit was brought against Topheavy Studios, Gathering of Developers, Sony and Microsoft. A girl explained that she was not informed that footage would be used to promote the video game. At the time the footage was recorded, the girl was only 17 years old, making her underage, thus making The Guy Game illegal to own or sell in some countries. A temporary injunction was granted, prohibiting the further production of copies of the game that contained the girl's image, voice and name.

After the lawsuit, developer Topheavy Studios released a DVD, The Guy Game: Game Over, which featured the footage filmed for the game as well as additional content and bonus features.

Platform bans
The Guy Game is explicitly banned from streaming on game streaming site Twitch, and is one of the only ESRB "M" rated games to be banned on the site.

Reception

The Guy Game received generally unfavorable reviews across all three platforms, with the Xbox version holding an aggregated Metacritic score of 47/100 based on 20 critic reviews, the PlayStation 2 version holding a score of 48/100 based on 20 reviews, and the Microsoft Windows version holding a score of 23/100 based on two reviews.

Conversely, IGN gave the game a 7.7 out of 10, stating "It may be tasteless, but I prefer this kind of tastelessness over BMX XXX." The reviewer also noted that the game was "solid, simple and fun".

References

External links
 

2004 video games
Gathering of Developers games
obscenity controversies in video games
PlayStation 2 games
quiz video games
video games developed in the United States
Windows games
women and video games
Xbox games